Cornus darvasica, synonym Swida darvasica, is a species of plant in the Cornaceae family. It is endemic to Tajikistan in central Asia.

References

Cornaceae
Critically endangered plants
Endemic flora of Tajikistan
Taxonomy articles created by Polbot